Against Apion ( and ; Latin Contra Apionem or In Apionem) is a polemical work written by Flavius Josephus as a defense of Judaism as a classical religion and philosophy against criticism by Apion, stressing its antiquity against what he perceived as more recent traditions of the Greeks. One of his main sources was Menander of Ephesus. Against Apion cites Josephus' earlier work Antiquities of the Jews, so can be dated after C.E. 94. It was possibly written in the early second century.

Text
Against Apion 1:8 also defines which books Josephus viewed as being in the Jewish Scriptures: 

In the second book, Josephus defends the historicity of the Jewish Bible against accusations made by Apion (who Josephus states is not Greek), arguing that Apion in fact rehashes material of Manetho's, though there was apparently some confusion between Manetho's references to the Hyksos and the Hebrews.

Josephus on Apion's blood libel (Against Apion 2:8):

Editions
Josephus, The Life. Against Apion (Loeb Classical Library), Harvard University Press, 1926.
Josephus, Flavius Josephus: Against Apion, trans. and comment. by John M. G. Barclay, Brill, 2013.

References

Further reading
Tessa Rajak, The Jewish Dialogue With Greece and Rome: Studies in Cultural and Social Interaction, Brill, 2002, chapter 11.
Juan Carlos Ossandón Widow, The Origins of the Canon of the Hebrew Bible: An Analysis of Josephus and Fourth Ezra, Brill, 2018, Part I.

External links

Gutenberg Project's text of Against Apion
Perseus Project's text of Against Apion
Loeb Classical Library Josephus Volume 1 Life and Against Apion

Works by Josephus
Jewish apologetics